Angel Ivanovich Bogdanovich (October 14 [o.s. 2], 1860, Haradok, Vitebsk Governorate, Russian Empire (modern Belarus) - April 6 [o.s. March 24], 1907, Saint Petersburg, Russian Empire) was a Russian literary critic, publicist and social activist, originally a narodnik, later an active member of the Legal Marxists' political group.

Biography
Angel Bogdanovich was born in Haradok, in the Gorodoksky Uyezd of the Vitebsk Governorate of the Russian Empire (present-day Belarus), an heir to a noble family of the Polish and Lithuanian origins. In 1880 he enrolled into the Kiev University. As a student of the medical faculty, he became a member of a Narodnik political circle, was expelled and got deported to the Nizny Novgorod governorate. There he became friends with Vladimir Korolenko and started contributing to several Privolzhye journals. In 1887 he moved to Kazan, there he edited the Volzhsky Vesnik newspaper. In 1893, now a Saint Petersburg resident, he founded there Narodnoye Pravo (People's Right) group and issued its political program in a brochure called Nasushchny Vopros (A Vital Question, 1894).

In the mid-1890s Bogdanovich drifted away from Narodniks and became a member of the Legal Marxists group. In the early 1890s Bogdanovich regularly contributed to Russkoye Bogatstvo, in 1894-1906 was a co-editor of and a key figure in Mir Bozhiy. In 1906 Mir Bozhiy was closed but re-emerged as Sovremenny Mir (Modern World) and for a year Bogdanovich was its editor.

Angel Bogdanovich died in Saint Petersburg on April 6, 1907.

References

External links
 

1860 births
1907 deaths
People from Haradok
People from Gorodoksky Uyezd
Lithuanian nobility
Belarusian nobility
19th-century Polish nobility
Narodniks
Russian Marxists
Russian literary critics
Russian editors
Taras Shevchenko National University of Kyiv, Medical faculty alumni